The Best Of Thompson Twins: Greatest Mixes is the first compilation album released by the British pop group the Thompson Twins. It was released in 1988, and features various 12" mixes and remixes of classic Thompson Twins songs. Most of the mixes were heavily edited by Tuta Aquino to fit into a single CD.

References

Best of Thompson Twins: Greatest Mixes, The
Albums produced by Nile Rodgers
Best of Thompson Twins: Greatest Mixes, The
Arista Records remix albums